It's a Joke, Son! is a 1947 American comedy film directed by Benjamin Stoloff (in his final directorial role in a film) featuring radio comedian Kenny Delmar as Senator Beauregard Claghorn, the inspiration for the cartoon character Foghorn Leghorn. The film was the first American production for Eagle-Lion Films and although it was produced on a very small budget compared to other Hollywood films, it was a box-office disappointment; one theater chain removed the film after less than a week after it only drew $1,000 in ticket sales.

The film contributed to a multimillion-dollar loss for Eagle-Lion in 1947, and Arthur B. Krim later stated that the studio had overpaid for Delmar and overestimated his bankability. It is in the public domain.

Plot 
When the Daughters of Dixie nominate Magnolia Claghorn as a candidate for state senator, the local political machine run by northerners fears that its candidate will be defeated. Through the Claghorns' daughter's boyfriend Jeff, the members of the machine concoct a plan to run Magnolia's husband Beauregard in order to split the anti-machine vote. However, when Beauregard attracts great popularity, they must seek to stop him.

Cast 

Kenny Delmar as Senator Beauregard Claghorn
Una Merkel as Mrs. Magnolia Claghorn
June Lockhart as Mary Lou Claghorn
Kenneth Farrell as Jefferson "Jeff" Davis
Douglass Dumbrille as Big Dan Healey
Jimmy Conlin as Senator Alexander P. Leeds
Matt Willis as Ace, Healey's Henchman
Ralph Sanford as Knifey, Healey's Henchman
Daisy as Daisy
Vera Lewis as Hortense Dimwitty
Margaret McWade as Jennifer Whipple
Ida Moore as Matilda Whipple

Soundtrack 
 Dixie
 The Bonnie Blue Flag

Notes

External links 

1947 comedy films
1947 films
American black-and-white films
American comedy films
Eagle-Lion Films films
Films based on radio series
Films directed by Benjamin Stoloff
1940s English-language films
1940s American films